Cruz Silva (born ) is an Indian politician and the Member of the Legislative Assembly representing the Velim Assembly constituency. He is a member of the Aam Aadmi Party. Silva was elected as an MLA in the 2022 Goa Legislative Assembly election.

Silva graduated as an engineer from the Goa Engineering College, Farmagudi in 1992.

Electoral history

2022 assembly election, Velim

References

Living people 
Goa MLAs 2022–2027
People from South Goa district
Aam Aadmi Party politicians from Goa
Year of birth missing (living people)